Jack Jenkins may refer to:

 Jack Jenkins (baseball) (1942–2002), American player
 Jack Jenkins (American football) (1921–1982), player
 Jack Jenkins (rugby union) (1880–1971), Wales international rugby union player
 Jack Jenkins (Welsh footballer) (1892–1946), Welsh international player
 Jack Jenkins (English footballer), English footballer

See also
 Jackie Jenkins (disambiguation)
 John Jenkins (disambiguation)